"Is It Love?" is the sixth single released from iiO's debut album, Poetica. It reached number one on the Billboard Hot Dance Club Play chart on October 21, 2006

Track listing

Other mixes include Major Key (AKA Frank Bailey) Vocal/Dub and Single Edit for Reconstruction Time, and Starkillers Made Club Edit/Single Edit on Made Gold.

See also
 List of number-one dance singles of 2006 (U.S.)

References

2006 singles
IiO songs
Songs written by Nadia Ali (singer)